Elke Maravilha ( Grünupp; 22 February 1945 – 16 August 2016) was a German-Brazilian actress, model and television personality. She lived in Brazil from her early childhood until her death.

Biography 
Maravilha was born in Leutkirch. At the age of six, her family emigrated to Brazil and first settled at a farm in Itabira in the state of Minas Gerais. In 1955, her family leased lands in Atibaia in São Paulo State, running a strawberry farm. The family then went to Bragança Paulista to farm. Returning to Minas Gerais, she was chosen as "Glamour Girl" in Belo Horizonte in 1962. It was during this period that she became a naturalized Brazilian.

At the age of 20, Maravilha left home to live in Rio de Janeiro, working as a bilingual secretary, using her fluency in eight languages, many of them learned in her own home environment, as a teacher of French and English. Her father became director of Liquigás corporation and was transferred to Porto Alegre. She returned to live with her family in Porto Alegre between 1966 and 1969, where she attended courses at the Federal University of Rio Grande do Sul faculties of philosophy, medicine and letters and trained as a translator and interpreter of foreign languages.

She took up modeling work at age 24, in 1969, in the same period in which she married a Greek writer, Alexandros Evremidis, the first of her eight marriages. During this time, she began a friendship with the fashion designer Zuzu Angel.

During the Brazilian military dictatorship in 1971, Maravilha was arrested for contempt at Santos Dumont Airport in Rio de Janeiro for tearing up posters of Stuart Angel Jones, her friend Zuzu's son, claiming that he had already been killed by the regime. She was arrested under the National Security Law and lost her Brazilian citizenship. She was released after six days, following the appeals of artist friends. Years later, she successfully applied for German citizenship.

Film portrayals 
She was portrayed by Luana Piovani in the 2006 biographical drama film Zuzu Angel. Maravilha also made a special guest appearance in the film. 

She was also portrayed by Gianne Albertoni in Chacrinha: O velho guerreiro, a 2018 film biography about Chacrinha.

Death 
Maravilha died in Rio de Janeiro on 16 August 2016 of multiple organ failure, from complications of a surgery to treat an ulcer.

Work

Television

Film

Stage 
 Paixão de Cristo
 Elke – do Sagrado ao Profano
 Viva o Cordão Encarnado
 O Castelo das Sete Torres
 Rio de Cabo a Rabo
 Eu Gosto de Mamãe
 Carlota Joaquina
 A Rainha Morta
 O Homem e o Cavalo
 Orfeu da Conceição
 O Lobo da Madrugada

Music 
Maravilha recorded the song "Que vontade de comer goiaba", available in the compilation album Dançando em duplo sentido.

References

External links 

 

1945 births
2016 deaths
People from Leutkirch im Allgäu
German actresses
Brazilian actresses
German emigrants to Brazil
People who lost Brazilian citizenship